Alexandru Popovici (born 9 April 1977) is a Moldovan footballer who plays for Iskra Rîbnița as striker.

Between 1996 and 2005 Popovici played for the Moldova national football team 21 matches, scoring three goals.

International goals 
Scores and results list Moldova's goal tally first.

Honours
Tiligul Tiraspol
Moldavian Cup: 1994, 1995

MSV Duisburg
DFB-Pokal Runner-up: 1997–98

FC Tiraspol
Moldavian Cup: 2012–13

References

External links
 
 
 
 
 
 
 
 

1977 births
Living people
Moldovan footballers
Moldova under-21 international footballers
Moldova international footballers
Moldovan expatriate footballers
CS Tiligul-Tiras Tiraspol players
MSV Duisburg players
FC Dynamo Moscow players
Russian Premier League players
FC Moscow players
Seongnam FC players
FC Dnipro players
FC Dnipro-2 Dnipropetrovsk players
FC Kryvbas Kryvyi Rih players
FC Zorya Luhansk players
FC Dacia Chișinău players
FC Tiraspol players
FK Andijon players
Simurq PIK players
FC Iskra-Stal players
FC Saxan players
FC Academia Chișinău players
FC Dinamo-Auto Tiraspol players
FC Florești players
Azerbaijan Premier League players
Bundesliga players
K League 1 players
Ukrainian Premier League players
Ukrainian Second League players
Ukrainian Amateur Football Championship players
Expatriate footballers in Ukraine
Moldovan expatriate sportspeople in Ukraine
Expatriate footballers in Germany
Moldovan expatriate sportspeople in Germany
Expatriate footballers in Russia
Moldovan expatriate sportspeople in Russia
Expatriate footballers in South Korea
Moldovan expatriate sportspeople in South Korea
Expatriate footballers in Uzbekistan
Moldovan expatriate sportspeople in Uzbekistan
Association football forwards
Transnistrian people
FC Tighina players
Expatriate footballers in Azerbaijan